The 1938 Chicago White Sox season was the White Sox's 38th season in the major leagues and their 39th season overall. They finished with a record of 65–83, good enough for 5th place in the American League, 32 games behind the first place New York Yankees.

Offseason 
 December 2, 1937: Vern Kennedy, Tony Piet, and Dixie Walker were traded by the White Sox to the Detroit Tigers for Mike Tresh, Marv Owen and Gee Walker.

Regular season

Season standings

Record vs. opponents

Opening Day lineup 
 Jackie Hayes, 2B
 Mike Kreevich, CF
 Gee Walker, RF
 Rip Radcliff, LF
 Joe Kuhel, 1B
 Marv Owen, 3B
 Boze Berger, SS
 Luke Sewell, C
 John Whitehead, P

Notable transactions 
 June 11, 1938: Bill Cox was traded by the White Sox to the St. Louis Browns for Jack Knott.

Roster

Player stats

Batting 
Note: G = Games played; AB = At bats; R = Runs scored; H = Hits; 2B = Doubles; 3B = Triples; HR = Home runs; RBI = Runs batted in; BB = Base on balls; SO = Strikeouts; AVG = Batting average; SB = Stolen bases

Pitching 
Note: W = Wins; L = Losses; ERA = Earned run average; G = Games pitched; GS = Games started; SV = Saves; IP = Innings pitched; H = Hits allowed; R = Runs allowed; ER = Earned runs allowed; HR = Home runs allowed; BB = Walks allowed; K = Strikeouts

Farm system 

LEAGUE CHAMPIONS: Monroe, Lubbock

Notes

References 
 1938 Chicago White Sox at Baseball Reference

Chicago White Sox seasons
Chicago White Sox season
Chicago White Sox